Urethane may refer to:

Ethyl carbamate, a chemical compound which is an ester of carbamic acid
Polyurethane, a polymer composed of a chain of organic units joined by carbamate (urethane) links
Carbamate, an organic compound derived from carbamic acid